Kambu Swayambhuva or Kambu Svayambhuva was an ancestor of the  Kambuja tribe and king of Aryadesa. He is listed and praised in shloka 22 of the Vedic Ekatmata Stotra hymn among Hindu sages, warriors and conquerors alongside Agastya, Narasimhavarman I, Rajendra Chola I, Ashoka, Pushyamitra Shunga and others.

History

Scholar George Coedes refers to a 10th century inscription of a Cambodian dynastic legend in which the hermit Kambu Swayambhuva  and the celestial nymph Mera unite and establish the Cambodian Solar royal dynasty (Kambu-Mera), that begins with the Chenla ruler Srutavarman and his son Sreshthavarman. Coedes suggests that the Kambu Swayambhuva legend has its origins in southern India, as a version of the Kanchi Pallava dynasty creation myth.

Claimed to be the eponym of the Kambojas, Kambu Swayambhuva is characterized as a Brahmin chieftain, married to Mera, who was given to him by Lord Shiva.

The name Kambu is stated to be a corruption of the standard Sanskrit Kamboja. English Scholars such as C. Lassen, S. Levi, Michael Witzel, J. Charpentier, A. Hoffman, A. B. Keith, A. A. Macdonell, H. W. Bailey and many others have traced the ethnic name Kamboja in the royal name Kambujadeshah (कम्बुजदेशः) in the Old Persian Inscriptions  Parskar Gryhamsutram spells the usual Kamboja as Kambuja. The Markandeya Purana (8.1-6) as well as in Srimad Devi Bhagawatam (5.28.1-12) etc. refers to the Kambojas as Kambu clan. King Ashoka's Rock Edicts V & XIII located at Peshawar write Kamboj as Kamboy or Kambo. 

Numerous Muslim writings of medieval era spell the Kamboj clan name as Kambu as well as Kambo. Obviously, these Kambu/Kambo terms are the corrupted forms of Kambuj/Kamboj and relate to the Kamboja of ancient Sanskrit and Pali texts and Inscriptions. This Sanskrit Kamboja appears as  K.b.u.ji.i.y, Kabujiya or perhaps Kabaujiya/Kaboujiya and Kambujiya or perhaps Kambaujiya ( OR with -n- in place of -m- as Kanbujiya or Kanbaujiya) of Old Persian inscriptions, and Cambyses of Greek writings. The same name appears as C-n-b-n-z-y in Aramaic, Kambuzia in Assyrian, Kambythet in Egyptian, Kam-bu-zi-ya or Ka-am-bu-zi-ya in Akkadian, Kan-bu-zi-ia or Kan-bu-si-ya in Elamite, and Kanpuziya in the Susan language.

See also
 List of kings of Cambodia
 Rishi

References

External links
 Full text of "Kambuja Desa"
 Ekatmata Stotra (in Sanskrit and English, Kambu mentioned on p.4)

Rishis
Indian hermits
Kambojas